Capitol station may refer to:
 Broad and Capitol station, San Francisco, California
 Capitol station (Caltrain), San Jose, California
 Capitol station (VTA), San Jose, California
 Capitol Heights station, Capitol Heights, Maryland
 Capitol/Rice Street station, St Paul, Minnesota
 Robert Street station, St Paul, Minnesota, formerly known as Capitol East
 Capitol Hill station, Seattle, Washington
 Capitol South station, Washington, D.C.